Participating in sports is a popular pastime in the Manawatu region of New Zealand, with many local clubs and venues catering for sports such as those listed below and other sports including athletics, archery, badminton, croquet, lawn bowls, squash, tennis and other minority sports. Secondary school and age-group sport is popular and actively encouraged.

Athletics 
Athletics including road running and cross country running thrives in the Manawatu. An all weather 400 metre athletics track is located at Massey University with grass tracks at Ashhurst and Feilding. Local clubs include Palmerston North AHC, Feilding Moa, Manawatu Striders and Ashhurst AC. Early January is the Super-7 series of 7km runs held for seven Tuesdays in a row and attracting 1500-2000 runners and walkers each week. Several New Zealand Championships have been held in the region including North Island Colgate Games, NZ Road Relays and NZ Secondary School cross country, All ages and abilities can participate in athletics from pre-school to 80+

Rugby union
Like the rest of New Zealand, rugby union is a popular sport in the winter. The men's representative team from Manawatu are the Turbos. The Turbos play in the Mitre 10 Cup, the premier competition in New Zealand provincial rugby. Their home ground is at Central Energy Trust Arena. At Super Rugby level, Manawatu is in the Hurricanes catchment zone and occasionally home matches are played here.

The Manawatu Cyclones are the province's representatives in the Women's Provincial Championship.  They also play at Central Energy Trust Arena, or at the rugby fields at Massey University.

Manawatu hosted two group matches during the 2011 Rugby World Cup.

Rugby league
There is a small but thriving rugby league scene in Manawatu, with a number of clubs in the region. They come from Palmerston North, Ohakea, Marton, Dannevirke, Foxton, Levin and Feilding. Teams from Wanganui, Taranaki and Hawke's Bay also play in Manawatu club competitions.

Speedway
Robertson Holden International Speedway is a popular participant and spectator sport. The local team is known as the Palmerston North Panthers. The raceway is at Central Energy Trust Arena (the track encircles the sports field).

Basketball
Basketball is played at the premier level in Manawatu. The Manawatu Jets, formerly the Palmerston North Jets, play in the NZBL. Basketball is governed by Palmerston North Basketball Association (PNBA). Their home is at Arena 2 (indoor) of Arena Manawatu.

Netball
Netball is popularly participated in Manawatu. The province is represented at ANZ Championship by the Central Pulse. Netball is governed by Netball Manawatu, based at Vautier Park in Roslyn. Arena 2 is the premier netball venue, often hosting Central Pulse home games and occasionally, the national side, the Silver Ferns play here also.

Hockey
Hockey is played at a premier level in the Manawatu. The region's premier teams are the Central Mavericks (men) and Central Mysticks (women). At the local level, numerous clubs exist and are governed by Hockey Manawatu.

The main venue is at the Twin Turfs, between Fitzherbert Park and Victoria Esplanade.

Cricket
Cricket is popular in Manawatu. The Central Districts Stags is the region's premier cricket team and plays in the national Plunket Shield; the Central Districts women's representative cricket team is the Central Districts Hinds. The Manawatu team competes in the Hawke Cup.

At a local level, numerous clubs exist in Palmerston North and the surrounding area, governed by the Manawatu Cricket Association. Fitzherbert Park, the premier cricket ground in Palmerston North, is one of the home grounds of Central Districts and the home ground of the Manawatu Cricket Association. Manawaroa-Ongley Park, also in Palmerston North, another important cricket venue, is the headquarters of the Manawatu Cricket Association.

Football (soccer)
Local association football (soccer) team YoungHeart Manawatu was one of the franchise teams competing in the New Zealand Football Championship, the premier national competition. The team formerly played at Central Energy Trust Arena, before relocating to Memorial Park. Numerous clubs exist in the city, and football is also popular at schools and at Massey University.

Cycling
Cycling is a popular competitive sport in the Manawatu region. The contrast of rolling hills and flat plains makes an attractive, challenging course.

The New Zealand Cycle Classic, Tour de Manawatu is raced here.

Golf
Three eighteen hole golf courses are here. Administered by Palmerston North Golf Club, Manawatu Golf Club and Linton Camp Golf Club.

Inline speed skating
One of New Zealand's most successful clubs, Manawatu Showgrounds is based in the city and has several national representatives in the sport.

References

Manawatu District
Sport in Manawatū-Whanganui